Eric Reese Fearon is an American oncologist. He is the Emanuel N. Maisel Professor of Oncology at the University of Michigan and director of the University of Michigan Rogel Cancer Center.

Early life and education
Fearon was born to parents Margaret and Ross in Maine and grew up alongside his older sister Gretchen. He attended Mt. Blue High School in Farmington, Maine before enrolling at Johns Hopkins University for his Bachelor of Arts degree, medical degree, and PhD. During his graduate studies at Johns Hopkins, Fearon was inducted into the Phi Beta Kappa.

After receiving his medical and doctoral degrees, Fearon conducted his postdoctoral research in the laboratory of Chi Van Dang, where he developed a system for the study of protein-protein interactions in living mammalian cells. Fearon also enrolled at the MD Anderson Cancer Center and was awarded the Wilson S. Stone Memorial Award.

Career
Fearon joined the University of Michigan (U-M) in 1995 as the associate director for Basic Science Research at the University of Michigan Rogel Cancer Center. In 1999, Fearon was elected a Fellow of the American Society for Clinical Investigation (ASCI). He later served as president of the ASCI from 2005 to 2006. He was named deputy director of the Rogel Cancer Center in 2005 and was Director in 2016.

During his tenure at U-M, Fearon's laboratory conducts research with the aim to address how cancer gene defects contribute to the development and progression of colorectal and other cancers. By 2013, he also served as the division chief of Molecular Medicine & Genetics in the Department of Internal Medicine and co-directed the U-M Cancer Center's Cancer Genetics Research Program. Fearon also chaired the National Institutes of Health and National Cancer Institute advisory groups and grant review committees. As a result of his research, Fearon was elected a member of the National Academy of Medicine. A few years later, Fearon was awarded the Distinguished Faculty Lectureship Award in Biomedical Research for being 
"a giant in the field of carcinogenesis, specifically colorectal cancer."

In 2018, Fearon was named a fellow of the American Association for the Advancement of Science for "distinguished contributions to the cancer field, particularly in defining the role of accumulated mutations in oncogenes and tumor suppressor genes in colon cancer pathogenesis."

Personal life
Fearon and his wife, Kathleen R. Cho, have two daughters together.

References

Living people
University of Michigan faculty
Johns Hopkins University alumni
Scientists from Maine
American oncologists
Members of the National Academy of Medicine
Fellows of the American Association for the Advancement of Science
People from Farmington, Maine
Year of birth missing (living people)